The 1915–16 season was the first season of special wartime football in England during the First World War.

Overview
Between 1915 and 1919 competitive football was suspended in England. Many footballers signed up to fight in the war and as a result many teams were depleted, and fielded guest players instead. The Football League and FA Cup were suspended and in their place regional league competitions were set up; appearances in these tournaments do not count in players' official records.

Honours
There were four regional leagues. Each league was split into a principal tournament and a subsidiary tournament, except the South-West Combination. The Lancashire and Midland Sections were split into further regional divisions, while the London Combination remained a single league.

See also
England national football team results (unofficial matches)

References

 
Wartime seasons in English football